Rossmore may refer to:

Rossmore, Johannesburg, South Africa
Rossmore, West Virginia, United States

Australia 
Rossmore, New South Wales, a suburb of Sydney
Rossmore, Queensland, a neighbourhood in the Gympie Region

United Kingdom 
Rossmore, a suburb of Ellesmere Port, Cheshire
Rossmore, a townland in Belleek, County Fermanagh
Rossmore, Dorset, a suburb of Poole